The following list of Iranian artists (in alphabetical order by last name) includes artists of various genres, who are notable and are either born in Iran, of Iranian descent or who produce works that are primarily about Iran.

Cinema artists

Actors and actresses

Directors and filmmakers

Film score composers 
 Hossein Alizadeh (born 1951)
 Fariborz Lachini (born 1949)
 Mehdi Rajabian (born 1989)
 Ahmad Pejman (born 1935)
 Peyman Yazdanian (born 1968)

Designers

Calligraphers

Fashion designers

Graphic designers

Illustrators 
 Mojtaba Heidarpanah (born 1990) is an Iranian cartoonist, illustrator, painter, character designer and animator
 Nahid Hagigat (born 1943), illustrations and paintings

Musicians and singers

Classical
See List of Iranian composers

Iranian classical/traditional

Western classical

Electronic

Pop

Lyricists

Rock/metal

Performing artists

Comedians

Dancers
 Farzaneh Kaboli
 Jamileh (born 1946)
 Shahrokh Moshkin Ghalam (born 1967)

Theatre directors

Theatre stage actors

Visual artists

Cartoonists

Multimedia and mixed media 

{{Columns-list|
 Golnar Adili (born 1976)
 Morehshin Allahyari (born 1985) (active since 2007), artist, activist 
 Shirin Aliabadi (1973–2018), multidisciplinary visual artist, active in Tehran and Paris.
 Shahin Charmi (born 1953), Iranian-born German multidisciplinary artist and muralist.
 Monir Shahroudy Farmanfarmaian (1924–2019) best known for her mirror mosaics, sculptor, painter, textile designer.
 Ghazel (1966), visual and performance artist
 Gita Hashemi (born 1961) (active since 1981), transdiscplinary, performance art, installations, digital and multimedia art
 Bahman Mohasses (1931–2010), painter, sculptor, translator, and theatre director
 Neda Moridpour (born 1983), artist, educator and co-founder of the artist-activist collaborative Louder than Words
 Shirin Neshat (born 1957), film, video and photography
 Hossein Nuri (born 1954), painter, dramaturge and filmmaker
 Ramin, Rokni, Hesam (born 1975,1978,1980)
 Mohammad Salemy (born 1967)
 Daryush Shokof (born 1954), artist, film director, writer, and film producer
Soheila_Sokhanvari (born 1964), painter, sculptor, and multi-media artist
Sheida Soleimani, (born 1990), Iranian-American, 'constructed' tableau photography.
 Parviz Tanavoli (born 1937), sculptor, painter, scholar and art collector
 Sadegh Tirafkan (1965–2013), photography, video installation, and collage
Hossein Valamanesh (born 1949), Iranian-Australian public art and multimedia.
 Hossein Zenderoudi (born 1937), painter and sculptor
 Afshin Naghouni (born 1969), painter, mixed media.
Saman and Sasan Oskouei (born 1985 & 1991), multidisciplinary artist-
activists <ref>

Painters

Photography

Sculpture and installation

See also
 Hurufiyya movement - label given to calligraphy-based visual artists
 List of Iranian Americans
 List of Iranian painters
 List of Iranian women artists
 List of Iranian writers
 Iranian modern and contemporary art

References

 
Artists
Iranian artists